Peter Flintsø (born 29 March 1968) is a Danish former professional tennis player.

Flintsø, who trained out of the Kjøbenhavns Boldklub, won three Danish national championships in doubles.

On the professional tour, Flintsø had best world rankings of 493 in singles and 151 in doubles. He featured in qualifying at the 1988 Wimbledon Championships and reached four doubles finals on the ATP Challenger Tour.

In 1989 he represented the Denmark Davis Cup team in a World Group play-off tie against Italy. He was beaten in the doubles and lost his singles rubber to Omar Camporese.

ATP Challenger finals

Doubles: 4 (0–4)

See also
List of Denmark Davis Cup team representatives

References

External links
 
 
 

1968 births
Living people
Danish male tennis players
20th-century Danish people